The MÁV class 424 is a famous class of Hungarian steam locomotives. The class appears in numerous nostalgic remembrances, in literature, in the movies and as models. The 424 class is a double-chimneyed, superheated machine. Its nicknames were "Buffalo" and "Nurmi" (after Paavo Nurmi, a famous Finnish runner well known in Hungary).

Locomotives of the same design operated in Yugoslavia as JŽ class 11.

Fifteen were supplied to North Korea as war aid during the Korean War; these kept their MÁV running numbers (424.006 through 424.020) in Korean State Railway service. These went to Záhony on the Hungarian–Soviet border under their own power, where they were disassembled and shipped via the USSR to China; in China they were reassembled and delivered to North Korea under their own power.

Description

MÁVAG began to manufacture the Class 424 in 1924, with 2′D axle layout (4-8-0 in Whyte notation). It made its first test run between Budapest and Vác on 22 April 1924. The planning was led by Béla Kertész (1882–1970) locomotive constructor.

The 424 was a universal main line locomotive.  It was used to haul heavy freight trains, stopping trains and express trains. The 424 locomotives are well known abroad as well.

When production ended in 1958, 514 machines had been produced, of which 149 were for foreign orders. They remained in service until 1984, when steam engines were withdrawn in Hungary.

The 424s were coal burners by design. In the early 1960s some engines were converted to burn oil, but their performance did not increase enough to compete with the diesel equipment of that time, like NOHAB DSB engines and Soviet-made M62s.

Preservation

Operational
Nowadays three working examples survived and used for historical and excursion trains. The surviving engines are 424,009; 424,247 and 424,287.

Plinthed exhibits
A few engines are exhibited on static display.
424,001 was accommodated at the Zagreb Railway Station, lately moved to Budapest and displayed in front of the Museum of Transportation.
424,124 is exhibited on the main station of Dombóvár (in the county of Tolna, found in central Hungary). The vehicle shows the times of the socialist era, with the red star in the front of the water tank.
424,309 is exhibited on the main station of Nagykanizsa
MÁV 424,320 is plinthed at Szolnok station.
MÁV 424,353 is exposed on Tokaj Station, North-Est of Hungary.

Appearances in Visual Media

Escape to Victory
In the film Escape to Victory, which was filmed in Hungary, MÁV 424,296 was the locomotive for the train that Sylvester Stallone playing Captain Robert Hatch uses to escape from the POW camp. Later in the film (and more clearly) it is used again as the transport for the Allied team to Paris. Dated photographs show that MÁV 424,296 had been scrapped by 1986.

See also 

 Tito's Blue Train
 Yugoslav Railways
 Hungarian Railways
 Serbian Railways

References

Sources
 
 
 

Steam locomotives of Hungary
4-8-0 locomotives
Railway locomotives introduced in 1924
Standard gauge locomotives of Hungary
Locomotives of North Korea
2′D h2 locomotives